2340 Hathor, provisional designation , is an eccentric stony asteroid, classified as near-Earth object and potentially hazardous asteroid. It belongs to the Aten group of asteroids and measures approximately 210 meters in diameter. Discovered by Charles Kowal in 1976, it was later named after the ancient Egyptian goddess Hathor.

Discovery 

Hathor was discovered on 22 October 1976, by American astronomer Charles Kowal at Palomar Observatory, California, United States. It was independently discovered by Eleanor Helin and is named for the ancient Egyptian deity Hathor.

Independent discoveries 

On 25 October 1976, Hathor was independently discovered by Eleanor Helin during the Palomar Planet-Crossing Asteroid Survey (PCAS), and by William Lawrence Sebok, who photographed the same field almost simultaneously using Palomars 1.22-meter Schmidt telescope. On the same day, the official discoverer Charles Kowal found that Hathor had already been imaged three days earlier by Palomars 0.46-meter telescope (the same instrument used by PCAS). A fourth independent discovery was made several days later by Nikolai Chernykh at CrAO on the Crimean peninsula.

The multiple discoveries were probably due to its very close approach distance to Earth. After 2062 Aten, Hathor was the second discovery of an Aten asteroid. In 1978, the third Aten, 2100 Ra-Shalom was discovered.

Orbit and classification 

Being a member of the Aten asteroids, Hathor orbits the Sun at a distance of 0.5–1.2 AU once every 0 years and 9 months (283 days). Its orbit has an eccentricity of 0.45 and an inclination of 6° with respect to the ecliptic. Its observation arc begins 3 days after its official discovery at Palomar, with no precoveries taken and no prior identifications made. Its orbital solution includes non-gravitational forces.

Close approaches 

Hathor has an Earth Minimum orbit intersection distance , which corresponds to 2.7 lunar distances (LD).

On 21 October 2014, when it passed Earth at 0.048 AU, or 18.8 LD, it was observed 22 times by the Goldstone Deep Space Network using radar astronomy over a period of 21 days from 10 to 31 October.

Physical characteristics 

In the Tholen and SMASS taxonomy, Hathor has a CSU and Sq spectral type, respectively.

Diameter and albedo 

In the 1990s, Dutch–American astronomer Tom Gehrels estimated Hathors diameter to measure approximately 300 meters, assuming an albedo of 0.15. During its close approach to Earth in October 2014, a team of astronomer published a revised estimate of  meters for its diameter. The Collaborative Asteroid Lightcurve Link adopts this diameter and derives an albedo of 0.3331 with an absolute magnitude of 20.2.

Rotation period 

In November 2014, American astronomer Brian Warner obtained a rotational lightcurve of Hathor from photometric observations taken at the Palmer Divide Station in Colorado (also see ). Light-curve analysis gave a well-defined rotation period of 3.350 hours with a brightness variation of 0.11 magnitude.

Naming 

In accordance with the custom to name all members of the Aten group after Ancient Egyptian deities, this minor planet is named for Hathor, sky-goddess and daughter of Ra, who personified the principles of joy, feminine love, and motherhood. The Ancient Greeks sometimes identified Hathor with the goddess Aphrodite. Naming was proposed by Eleanor Helin who also participated in the 1981-recovery. The minor planet 161 Athor is also named for Hathor. The official naming citation was published by the Minor Planet Center on 1 June 1981.

References

External links 
 Lightcurve plot (i) for (2340) Hathor, 21–22 October 2014, Brian Warner, CS3
 Lightcurve plot (ii) for (2340) Hathor, 30 October to 3 November 2014, Brian Warner, CS3
 Goldstone Asteroid Schedule
 Asteroid Lightcurve Database (LCDB), query form (info )
 Dictionary of Minor Planet Names, Google books
 Asteroids and comets rotation curves, CdR – Observatoire de Genève, Raoul Behrend
 
 
 

002340
Discoveries by Charles T. Kowal
Named minor planets
002340
002340
002340
002340
20141021
19761022
Hathor